Coming Home is a British television family history series on BBC Wales that aired from 2004 to 2015. The shows follow celebrities as they trace their Welsh heritage and roots.

List of series with subject and area covered

Series 1 (2004)
 1 Donny Osmond (singer) - Merthyr Tydfil - 9 July 2004
 2 Cilla Black (singer) - Wrexham and Holywell

Series 2 (2005)
 1 Rolf Harris (entertainer) - Merthyr Tydfil
 2 Susan Sarandon (actress) - Bridgend
 3 Paul Daniels (magician) - Carmarthen
 4 Patrick Mower (actor) - Carmarthen and Rhondda
 5 Petula Clark (singer) - Merthyr Tydfil
 6 Janet Street Porter (journalist and broadcaster) - Llanfairfechan
 7 Pam Ferris (actress) - Aberkenfig

Series 3 (2006)
 1 Michael York (actor) - Llandeilo and Llandovery
 2 Christopher Timothy (actor) - Bala
 3 Olivia Newton-John (singer) - Cardiff
 4 Michael Heseltine (politician) - Swansea

Series 4 (2009)
 1 Michelle Collins (actress) - Pontypridd
 2 Gabby Logan (presenter) - Cardiff
 3 John Prescott (politician) - Prestatyn and Chirk
 4 Samantha Bond (actress) - Abergwynfi, Cwmystwyth and Cilfynydd
 5 Terry Jones (actor) - Colwyn Bay

Series 5 (2010)
 1 Michael Sheen (actor) - Newport, Liverpool and Port Talbot
 2 Siân Williams (news presenter) - Rhondda
 3 Michael Ball (singer) - Cardiff
 4 Ruth Madoc (actress) - Llanwnda and Llansamlet
 5 Sarah Greene (presenter) - Cardiff - 22 December 2010

Series 6 (2011)
 1 Neil Kinnock (politician) - Tredegar - 30 November 2011
 2 Trevor Eve (actor) - Swansea and Glynneath - 7 December 2011
 3 Alison Steadman (actress) - Trefarclawdd, Oswestry and Ruabon - 14 December 2011
 4 Charles Dale (actor) - Tenby - 21 December 2011

Series 7 (2012)
 1 Gethin Jones (presenter) - Barry and Pontyberem - 23 November 2012
 2 Fiona Phillips (presenter) - Newport (Pembrokeshire) and Haverfordwest - 30 November 2012
 3 Katherine Jenkins (singer) - Neath and Porthcawl - 7 December 2012
 4 Robert Glenister (actor) - Gower - 14 December 2012

Series 8 (2013)
1 John Rhys-Davies (actor) - Ammanford - 29 November 2013
2 Tanni Grey-Thompson (paralympian, politician) - Cardiff - 6 December 2013
3 Shakin' Stevens (singer) - Cardiff - 13 December 2013
4 John Humphrys (journalist, broadcaster) - Cardiff - 16 December 2013

Series 9 (2014)
1 David Emanuel (fashion designer) - 5 December 2014
2 Ian Puleston-Davies (actor) - 8 December 2014
3 Alex Jones (presenter) - Llanelli and Carmarthenshire- 12 December 2014
4 Siân Lloyd (presenter) - Amlwch, Bethesda and Carmarthen - 15 December 2014

Series 10 (2015)
1 Sian Phillips
2 Ben Miller
3 Jeremy Bowen
4 Iwan Thomas

External links
 
 Family Search Wiki page Source of most of the initial information

References

BBC television documentaries
BBC Cymru Wales television shows
Welsh television shows
Welsh genealogy
2004 British television series debuts
2015 British television series endings
2000s Welsh television series
2010s Welsh television series
Television series about family history